Dzambolat Valeryevich Khastsayev (born 22 February 1995) is a Russian professional football player.

Club career
He made his debut in the Russian Premier League on 26 May 2013 for FC Spartak Vladikavkaz in a game against FC Spartak Moscow.

External links

References

1995 births
Sportspeople from Vladikavkaz
Living people
Russian footballers
Association football forwards
Russia youth international footballers
FC Spartak Vladikavkaz players
FC Chernomorets Novorossiysk players
FC Dynamo Stavropol players
Russian Premier League players
Russian First League players
Russian Second League players
Armenian First League players
Russian expatriate footballers
Expatriate footballers in Armenia
Russian expatriate sportspeople in Armenia